The Ingarö Ladies Open was a women's professional golf tournament on the Swedish Golf Tour and LET Access Series played between 1993 and 2014 near Stockholm, Sweden.

At the 2013 event Solheim Cup player Charlotta Sörenstam was in contention after opening rounds of 68 and 69, but had to settle for a tie for 7th after a final round of 75.

In 2014 an 18-year-old Georgia Hall finished solo third in her professional debut, one stroke behind Caroline Rominger.

Winners

References

External links

LET Access Series events
Swedish Golf Tour (women) events
Golf tournaments in Sweden